This page details football records in Croatia. It counts only results and records from 1992 onwards, as that year marked both Croatia's re-admittance into FIFA and start of Croatian First Football League. Prior 1992 Croatian clubs were part of Football Association of Yugoslavia. Croatia declared independence from Yugoslavia in 1991. In 1993 Croatia was admitted into UEFA.

National team
As of 11 September 2018.

Players
Most appearances: Darijo Srna and Luka Modrić (134)
Most goals: Davor Šuker (45)
Most goals in a single game: Mladen Petrić (4, Croatia - Andorra 7-0, 7 October 2006)

Results
Biggest win: 10 goals marginCroatia - San Marino 10-0, 4 June 2016 (friendly)
Biggest defeat: 6 goals marginSpain - Croatia 6-0, 11 September 2018 (2018–19 UEFA Nations League)
Most games won in row: 6 on two occasions (7 October 2006 - 2 June 2007 and 8 October 2009 - 23 May 2010)
Most games without losing: 16 (18 June 2006 - 11 November 2007; 12 wins, 4 draws)
Most games lost in row: 3 (3 June 2006 - 13 June 2006)
Most games without winning: 6 on two occasions (10 February 1999 - 13 June 1999; 3 draws, 3 losses and 28 May 2006 - 22 June 2006; 3 draws, 3 losses)

Major competitions
World Cup appearances: 5/6 (1998, 2002, 2006, 2014, 2018)
European Championship appearances: 5/6 (1996, 2004, 2008, 2012, 2016)

Croatian First Football League

Club records

Appearances and results
 Titles
 Most titles: Dinamo Zagreb (21)
 Most consecutive titles: Dinamo Zagreb (11)
 Appearances and relegation
 Most seasons in the top flight: Dinamo Zagreb, Hajduk Split, Rijeka, Osijek (30)
 Fewest seasons in the top flight: Dubrava, Lučko, Neretva, Orijent, Samobor, TŠK Topolovac, Vukovar '91 (1)
 Most times relegated: Cibalia, Zadar (4)
 Most matches played: Osijek, Rijeka (951)
 Wins
 Most wins: Dinamo Zagreb (661)
 Most wins in a season: Dinamo Zagreb (30, 2006–07)
 Fewest wins in a season: Dubrovnik, Šibenik (2, 1992), Varaždin (2, 2011–12)
 Draws
 Most draws: Rijeka (253)
 Most draws in a season: Cibalia (18, 2000–01)
 Fewest draws in a season: Cibalia (0, 1996–97)
 Defeats
 Most defeats: Osijek (334)
 Most defeats in a season: Radnik (29, 1993–94)
 Fewest defeats in a season: Dinamo Zagreb (0, 2014–15)
 Goals
 Most goals scored: Dinamo Zagreb (2080)
 Most goals scored in a season: Dinamo Zagreb (98, 1993–94)
 Fewest goals scored in a season: Dubrovnik (4, 1992)
 Most goals conceded: Osijek (1218)
 Most goals conceded in a season: Radnik (109, 1993–94)
 Fewest goals conceded in a season: NK Zagreb (9, 1992)

Scorelines
 Biggest win: Hajduk Split 10–0 Radnik (5 June 1994)
 Biggest away win: Radnik 0–7 Osijek (30 April 1994); Istra 1961 0–7 Rijeka (4 May 2019)
 Highest scoring: Dinamo Zagreb 10–1 Pazinka (12 December 1993)
 Highest scoring draw: Rijeka 4–4 Cibalia (27 August 1995); Rijeka 4–4 Inter Zaprešić (15 October 1995); Zadar 4–4 Rijeka (11 September 2011)

Runs and streaks
 Longest winning streak: Dinamo Zagreb (28)
 Home: Dinamo Zagreb (29)
 Away: Dinamo Zagreb (12)
 Longest unbeaten run: Dinamo Zagreb (50)
 Home: Dinamo Zagreb (103)
 Away: Dinamo Zagreb (24)
 Longest winless run: Istra 1961 (30)
 Home: Istra 1961 (15)
 Away: Međimurje (31)
 Longest losing streak: TŠK Topolovac (16)
 Home: Rudeš, Inter Zaprešić (8)
 Away: Međimurje (17)
 Longest drawing streak: Šibenik (6)
 Home: Zadar (6)
 Away: Slaven Belupo (7)
 Longest scoring run: Dinamo Zagreb (61)
 Home: Dinamo Zagreb (70)
 Away: Dinamo Zagreb (30)
 Longest conceding run: TŠK Topolovac, Varaždin (30)
 Home: Osijek (21)
 Away: Istra (42)
 Longest scoreless run: RNK Split (12)
 Home: RNK Split, Inter Zaprešić (6)
 Away: Neretva, Slaven Belupo, RNK Split (9)
 Longest run without conceding: Dinamo Zagreb (10)
 Home: Dinamo Zagreb, Hajduk Split, Pazinka, NK Zagreb (8)
 Away: Dinamo Zagreb (7)

Individual records

Appearances
 Most appearances: 478, Jakov Surać
 Most minutes played: 35,138 minutes, Jakov Surać
 Most appearances (foreign players): 293, Edin Mujčin
 Appearances in most seasons: 22, Jakov Surać
 Appearances for most clubs: 8, Željko Ačkar, Vedran Celiščak, Domagoj Kosić, Anđelko Kvesić, Krunoslav Rendulić, Zoran Zekić
 Most used substitute: 99, Hrvoje Štrok
 Most substituted: 127, Miljenko Mumlek
 Youngest player: Marko Dabro (16 years, 2 days)
 Oldest player: Vanja Iveša (40 years, 276 days)
 Oldest débutante: Vlado Benšak (37 years, 96 days)

Goals
 Most goals: 146, Davor Vugrinec
 By a foreign player: 84, Marijo Dodik
 In one season: 34, Eduardo (2006–07)
 In one match: 6, Marijo Dodik (Slaven Belupo 7–1 Varteks, 21 October 2000)
 From the penalty spot: 29, Ivan Krstanović
 As a substitute: 20, Ivan Krstanović
 On debut: 2, Domagoj Abramović, Ardian Kozniku, Ante Milicic, Mario Ćuže
 Against single opposition: 14, Igor Cvitanović (v. Osijek), Davor Vugrinec (v. Osijek), Ivan Krstanović (v. Hajduk Split, v. Istra 1961)
 Scored in most seasons: 17, Miljenko Mumlek
 Most own goals: 4, Marin Oršulić
 Youngest goalscorer: Lovro Zvonarek (16 years, 14 days)
 Oldest goalscorer: Davor Vugrinec (39 years, 355 days)
 Fastest goal: 10 seconds, Edin Šaranović (Kamen Ingrad 1–0 Inter Zaprešić, 3 April 2004)
 Most appearances without scoring (outfield players only): 223, Boris Leutar

Goalkeeping
 Most appearances: 304, Ivica Solomun
 Most clean sheets: 100, Ivica Solomun
 Longest run without conceding a goal: 951 minutes, Ivan Kelava
 Most saved penalties: 6, Goran Blažević, Tihomir Bulat, Mladen Matković, Dominik Livaković

Disciplinary
 Most yellow cards: 104, Damir Vuica
 Most red cards: 12, Krunoslav Rendulić
 Most appearances without a card: 77, Kristijan Kahlina

Managerial
 Most appearances for a manager: 460, Stanko Mršić
 Most wins for a manager: 156, Stanko Mršić
 Most draws for a manager: 133, Stanko Mršić
 Most defeats for a manager: 171, Stanko Mršić
 Most clubs managed: 11, Luka Bonačić
 Managed a club in most seasons: 21, Stanko Mršić
 Youngest manager: Marko Lozo (28 years, 143 days)
 Oldest manager: Miroslav Blažević (79 years, 302 days)
 Longest-serving manager (per appointment): 2045 days, Matjaž Kek (27 February 2013 to 6 October 2018)

Croatian Football Cup

Club records

Appearances and results
 Most titles: Dinamo Zagreb (15)
 Most appearances: Dinamo Zagreb, Hajduk Split, Inter Zaprešić, Rijeka, Osijek (29)
 Most final appearances: Dinamo Zagreb (22)
 Most final appearances without winning the title: Varaždin (6)
 Number of teams that have reached the final: 13
 Number of teams that have reached the final but failed to win: 8
 Most matches played: Dinamo Zagreb (191)
 Most wins: Dinamo Zagreb (141)
 Most draws: Hajduk Split (33)
 Most defeats: Osijek, Varaždin (36)
 Most goals scored: Dinamo Zagreb (518)
 Most goals conceded: Hajduk Split (151)

Scorelines
 Biggest win: Gaj Mače 20–2 NK Lika 95 Korenica, 2020–21
 Biggest aggregate win: MIV Sračinec 1–21 (0–11, 1–10) Dinamo Zagreb, 1995–96
 Highest scoring: Gaj Mače 20–2 NK Lika 95 Korenica, 2020–21

Individual records

Appearances
 Most appearances: 70, Miljenko Mumlek
 Most final appearances: 14, Dražen Ladić

Goals
 Most goals: 33, Davor Vugrinec
 Most goals (cup final): 5, Igor Cvitanović
 Most goals (season): 13, Goran Vlaović (1992–93)
 Most goals (match): 8, Andrej Kramarić (Rijeka 11–0 Zmaj Blato, 9 October 2013)
 Most goals (as a substitute): 6, Tomo Šokota, Mark Viduka

Disciplinary
 Most yellow cards: 13, Josip Milardović
 Most red cards: 3, Zoran Ratković
 Most appearances without a card: 35, Tomislav Butina

Managerial
 Most appearances for a manager: 47, Stanko Mršić
 Most final appearances for a manager: 6, Miroslav Blažević, Zlatko Kranjčar, Elvis Scoria
 Most wins for a manager: 25, Matjaž Kek
 Most draws for a manager: 10, Stanko Mršić
 Most defeats for a manager: 14, Stanko Mršić

UEFA competitions

Club records

Appearances and results
 Overall
 Most matches played: Dinamo Zagreb (253)
 Most wins: Dinamo Zagreb (106)
 Most draws: Dinamo Zagreb (52)
 Most defeats: Dinamo Zagreb (95)
 Most goals scored: Dinamo Zagreb (376)
 Most goals conceded: Dinamo Zagreb (327)
 Champions League
 Most matches played: Dinamo Zagreb (140)
 Most wins: Dinamo Zagreb (59)
 Most draws: Dinamo Zagreb (29)
 Most defeats: Dinamo Zagreb (52)
 Most goals scored: Dinamo Zagreb (209)
 Most goals conceded: Dinamo Zagreb (192)
 Europa League
 Most matches played: Dinamo Zagreb (111)
 Most wins: Dinamo Zagreb (46)
 Most draws: Dinamo Zagreb (23)
 Most defeats: Dinamo Zagreb (42)
 Most goals scored: Dinamo Zagreb (164)
 Most goals conceded: Dinamo Zagreb (131)
 Europa Conference League
 Most matches played: Rijeka (6)
 Most wins: Rijeka (3)
 Most draws: Rijeka, Osijek (2)
 Most defeats: Rijeka, Osijek, Hajduk Split (1)
 Most goals scored: Rijeka (9)
 Most goals conceded: Rijeka, Osijek (5)
 Cup Winners' Cup
 Most matches played: Varteks (10)
 Most wins: Varteks (6)
 Most draws: Varteks (1)
 Most defeats: Varteks (3)
 Most goals scored: Varteks (15)
 Most goals conceded: Varteks (10)
 Intertoto Cup
 Most matches played: Slaven Belupo (34)
 Most wins: Slaven Belupo (17)
 Most draws: Slaven Belupo (7)
 Most defeats: Slaven Belupo (10)
 Most goals scored: Slaven Belupo (50)
 Most goals conceded: Slaven Belupo (30)

Individual records

Appearances
 Most appearances (overall): 91, Arijan Ademi
 Most appearances (Champions League): 49, Arijan Ademi
 Most appearances (Europa League): 43, Ivan Tomečak
 Most appearances (Europa Conference League): 6, six players
 Most appearances (Cup Winners' Cup): 10, Dražen Madunović
 Most appearances (Intertoto Cup): 28, Petar Bošnjak

Goals
 Most goals (overall): 21, Mislav Oršić
 Most goals (Champions League): 10, Hillal Soudani, Mislav Oršić
 Most goals (Europa League): 11, Mislav Oršić
 Most goals (Europa Conference League): 2, Prince Ampem, Denis Bušnja, Marin Ljubičić
 Most goals (Cup Winners' Cup): 5, Miljenko Mumlek
 Most goals (Intertoto Cup): 15, Marijo Dodik

Bibliography
 Croatian Football Statistics (www.hrnogomet.com) 

Football in Croatia
Association football in Croatia lists